The men's double trap shooting event at the 2015 Pan American Games was held on July 16 at Pan Am Shooting Centre in Innisfil.

The event consisted of three rounds: a qualifier, a semifinal and a medal round. In the qualifier, each shooter fired 5 sets of 30 shots in trap shooting. Shots were paired, with two targets being launched at a time.

The top 6 shooters in the qualifying round moved on to the semifinal. There, they fired one additional round of 30. The top 2 qualified to dispute the golden medal, while the third and fourth place qualified to dispute the bronze medal.. Ties are broken using a shoot-off; additional shots are fired one pair at a time until there is no longer a tie.

The winners of all fifteen events, along with the runner up in the men's air rifle, skeet, trap and both women's rifle events will qualify for the 2016 Summer Olympics in Rio de Janeiro, Brazil (granted the athlete has not yet earned a quota for their country).

Schedule

Records 
The existing world and Pan American Games records were as follows.

Results

Qualification round

Semifinal

Final

Bronze-medal match

Gold-medal match

References

Shooting at the 2015 Pan American Games